Ayewoubo Akomatsri (born 15 August 1964) is a Togolese boxer. He competed in the men's bantamweight event at the 1988 Summer Olympics.

References

External links
 

1964 births
Living people
Togolese male boxers
Olympic boxers of Togo
Boxers at the 1988 Summer Olympics
Place of birth missing (living people)
Bantamweight boxers
21st-century Togolese people